Exocyst complex component 3-like is a protein that in humans is encoded by the EXOC3L gene.

References

Further reading